Peter Henry Zeihan (born January 18, 1973) is an American geopolitical analyst and author.

Early life, education, and career
Born in 1973, Peter grew up the adopted son of educators Jerald and Agnes Zeihan in Marshalltown, Iowa, graduating from Marshalltown High School in 1992. In 1995, he obtained a BSc in Political Science from what then was Northeast Missouri State University, a postgraduate degree in Asian studies from University of Otago (Dunedin, New Zealand) in 1997, and another from the Patterson School of Diplomacy and International Commerce of the University of Kentucky in 1999.

Discouraged by his experiences during his work at the American Embassy in Australia and at Susan Eisenhower's think tank, the Center for Political and Strategic Studies, he began working as an analyst for Austin-based geopolitical intelligence firm Stratfor in 2000. Zeihan spent 12 years at Stratfor, eventually rising to vice-president.

While still at Stratfor, Zeihan coauthored his first book, A Crucible of Nations, with Lauren Goodrich in 2011. The book discusses the Caucasus region of Eastern Europe.

Zeihan left Stratfor in 2012, founding his consulting firm Zeihan on Geopolitics that same year. His client list would grow to include energy companies, financial institutions, business associations, agricultural interests, universities, and other government organizations.

In 2014 he released Accidental Superpower. The book was reviewed by The Washington Post, The Wall Street Journal, and Kirkus Reviews. The book focused on topographical and geographical landmarks (rivers, oceans, mountains, etc.) as distinct advantages in a nation's ability to dominate others economically, industrially, and militarily. With the use of maps, Zeihan pointed out that navigable rivers, or access to the oceans, along with a reliable road or rail network make a critical difference, of which the U.S. is featured to have 12 navigable rivers, two oceans on its flanks, which are key in relying less on large land infrastructure projects. These land features, in turn, "encourage small government".  Another three books were published afterwards including The Absent Superpower (2017), Disunited Nations (2020), and The End of the World Is Just the Beginning (2022).

Publications

See also
 George Friedman, founder of Stratfor

References

External links

 
 

1973 births
Living people
Writers from Iowa
American male non-fiction writers
American political writers
American adoptees
Geopoliticians
Truman State University alumni
University of Otago alumni
University of Kentucky alumni
21st-century American male writers
21st-century American non-fiction writers
Place of birth missing (living people)
American gay writers